Bramham Park is a Grade I listed 18th-century country house in Bramham, between Leeds and Wetherby, in West Yorkshire, England.

The house, constructed of magnesian limestone ashlar with stone slate roofs in a classical style, is built to a linear plan with a main range linked by colonnades to flanking pavilions. The main block is of three storeys with a raised forecourt. The house is surrounded by a 200 ha (500 acre) landscaped park ornamented by a series of follies and avenues laid out in the 18th-century landscape tradition, surrounded by 500 ha (1235 acres) of arable farmland. Bramham park is used annually for the Leeds Festival.

History

The Baroque mansion was built in 1698 for Robert Benson, 1st Baron Bingley. It has remained in the ownership of Benson's descendants since its completion in 1710. He died with no male heirs and the barony was extinguished. The estate passed into the hands of his son-in-Law George Fox-Lane (c.1697–1773), who was given the re-created title of Baron Bingley in 1763. His son and heir, the Honourable Robert Fox-Lane, Member of Parliament for York, predeceased him in 1768 and the barony consequently became extinct a second time on his death in 1773. The estate was inherited for life by his illegitimate daughter Mary, who had married Sir John Goodricke of Ribston Hall and died in 1792. It then passed to the first Baron's nephew, James Fox-Lane, who considerably improved the estate.

From him the estate went to his son George Lane-Fox, known as "The Gambler", who was the MP for Beverley. Following a serious fire in 1828 he was obliged to move to nearby Bowcliffe Hall. The Bramham Park house was then left empty and derelict for 80 years until restored for his grandson George Lane-Fox under the supervision of the architect Detmar Blow in about 1908. George became 1st Baron Bingley of the third creation when the title was recreated in 1933, but had four daughters and no sons meaning that the barony was extinguished for the third time upon his death. The house was inherited by his eldest daughter Marcia, whose husband Joe Ward-Jackson adopted the Lane-Fox surname. Their son George Lane Fox (1931–2012), after 20 years in the Household Cavalry, moved into the Hall and put the estate on an up-to-date financial footing, founding the annual Bramham Horse Trials in 1974.

Today it remains a private residence in the hands of George's son, Nick, while the park is the setting for the Horse Trials and the Leeds Festival, which moved to Bramham in 2003.

A restricted area of the grounds is kept as gardens and run as a tourist attraction — visitors can also tour the house but only in pre-arranged parties.

It was used as the setting for the third series of The Syndicate.

Architecture 

Bramham is a product of a grand tour; its creator Robert Benson, later Lord Bingley, completed his formal education with a grand tour in 1697, and whilst in Italy he began to envisage his new mansion in the Palladian manner complemented in a landscaped park, in the fashion made popular by Le Nôtre in France in the late 17th century.

The architect of Bramham is unknown, although it is speculated that Giacomo Leoni was involved  (Leoni was responsible for the rebuilding of Lyme Park in an Italianate style in the neighbouring county of Cheshire some years later). However, Leoni did not arrive in England until several years after the completion of Bramham. Other names suggested include those of James Gibbs, Thomas Archer and James Paine. It is known that Paine designed the stables which flank the corps de logis, but the other contenders were too young. The only chronological possibility is Thomas Archer (1668–1743). The most likely scenario is that Bramham is the work of Robert Benson himself, probably working with a local draughtsman.  While it is also quite possible that Benson was inspired by drawings taken from Palladio's books, the design of the house suggests that Benson was more inspired by the restrained Baroque style then popular in France, the style in which Mansart's Versailles was constructed between 1678 and 1684. Indeed, it has been speculated that Versaille's landscape architect André le Nôtre had a hand in the design of Bramham's landscaped park.

The architect William Talman has also been suggested as a possible architect, and he was indeed working on Chatsworth House some sixty miles away from Bramham at this time.  However, unlike Chatsworth (which is far larger), Bramham is given flanking wings more in the Palladian style, linked to the house by short colonnades. The flanking wings contained the kitchen in the south wing, and the chapel in the north, thus – as at the Baroque Blenheim Palace – balancing both spiritual and bodily needs equally. However, while Campbell's drawing of Bramham show the never-executed statuary on the roof and near-perfect proportions, the reality of the executed design suggests a less professional hand than Talman's. Two low projecting wings from the corps de logis complicate the design, while the two colonnades are not quite long enough to give the flanking wings the independence from the main house to allow their design to be fully appreciated.

Interior 

The interior of Bramham Park was completely restored in the early part of the 20th century, having mostly been abandoned after the fire of 1828. The central Great Hall, double storey in height and severe in its Baroque design, still bears the smoke staining on its stone walls.

Grounds 
The parkland surrounding the house contains a number of grade I listed ornamental structures, including:

 The Chapel
Situated at the rear of the house, the chapel, was built around 1760 by James Paine for George Fox Lane in the local Magnesian limestone ashlar. It was constructed in the classical style as a single unit of 2 storeys and 3 bays and with a porch and four Ionic columns across the full width of ground floor.

Originally built as a Palladian Temple it was later used as an Orangery, a summerhouse and then consecrated as a chapel around 1906.

 The Gothic temple
South of the house stands the Gothic Temple, also constructed of Magnesian limestone ashlar in the 18th century. Built in a Gothic style in two storeys it is octagonal in plan with buttresses at each corners.

In 1907 it was converted into a water tower to supply spring water to the house and was used as such until after the  World War II.

 The Open Temple
The Open Temple was probably constructed in the early 18th century in Magnesian limestone ashlar and was built in a classical style as a single cell with a pedimented 3-bay facade.

The temple was also known as the Lead Lads Temple from the lead statues which once stood on the pediment. They were stolen by vandals.

 The Ionic Temple or Rotunda
Standing in the Black Fen pleasure ground, the Ionic Temple was probably built in the mid 18th century by James Paine for George Lane Fox. It is constructed of sandstone ashlar in the form of a circular Ionic temple on a 3-step podium with a colonnade of 16 unfluted Ionic columns supporting an entablature.

The Black Fen lies a mile from the house. From the Rotunda six straight paths lead to other features of the estate.

Legacy
Bramham Island on the north side of Queen Charlotte Strait in the Central Coast region of British Columbia, Canada, was named after Bramham Park.  Named in association with it were Slingsby Channel, on its north side, and the Fox Islands, which lie in the entrance to that channel at its opening into Queen Charlotte Strait.

It became the filming location of the third series of The Syndicate in 2014; the manor was used as the fictional Hazelwood manor.

See also
Grade I listed buildings in West Yorkshire
Listed buildings in Bramham cum Oglethorpe
Listed buildings in Barwick in Elmet and Scholes

Notes

References

External links

Official website

Country houses in West Yorkshire
Gardens in West Yorkshire
Historic house museums in West Yorkshire
Grade I listed buildings in West Yorkshire
Thomas Archer buildings
Grade I listed houses